Gephyrochromis lawsi is a species of haplochromine cichlid which is endemic to the northern part of Lake Malawi in Malawi and Tanzania. They feed mainly on loose aufwuchs. The males are weakly territorial and will defend their territories against intruderswhile the females are solitary. It may be threatened by overfishing by fishermen using beach seine nets, although it is a bycatch rather than one of the target species, it is sometimes collected for the aquarium trade. The specific name honours the Scottish missionary Robert Laws (1851-1934).

References

lawsi
Cichlid fish of Africa
Fish of Malawi
Freshwater fish of Tanzania
Fish described in 1957
Taxa named by Geoffrey Fryer
Taxonomy articles created by Polbot
Fish of Lake Malawi